Gordon Hedley Salmon (1 August 1894 – 13 June 1978) was an English cricketer active from 1913 to 1929 who played for Leicestershire. He was born in Leicester and died in Exmouth. He appeared in 47 first-class matches as a righthanded batsman who scored 1,273 runs with a highest score of 72.

Notes

 
1894 births
1978 deaths
English cricketers
Leicestershire cricketers